The United Kingdom's National Transmission System (NTS) is the network of gas pipelines that supply gas to about forty power stations and large industrial users from natural gas terminals situated on the coast, and to gas distribution companies that supply commercial and domestic users. It covers Great Britain, i.e. England, Wales and Scotland.

History

Origins 
The system originated in the construction during 1962–3 of the 200-mile (320 km) high-pressure methane pipeline from Canvey Island (on the Essex coast) to Leeds. Imported liquified natural gas (LNG) from Algeria was turned into gas at the Canvey terminal and supplied to the pipeline, providing eight of the twelve area gas boards with access to natural gas. The gas was initially used to manufacture town gas, either as a feedstock in gas reforming processes or to enrich lean gases such as that produced by the Lurgi coal gasification process.

The pipeline was 18-inch (460 mm) in diameter and operated at 1,000 pounds per square inch (69 bar). The pipeline had 150 miles (240 km) of spur lines, supplying gas to area boards.

The Gas Council was responsible for this £10 million co-operative scheme and the construction details were a joint effort of the distribution engineers of the area boards.

LNG had first been imported to Canvey from Louisiana in February 1959, and piped to Romford gasworks as feedstock to a reforming plant.

UK natural gas 
Natural gas was discovered on the UK continental shelf in 1965 and production started in 1967. The development of offshore natural gas fields is shown in the following table. Shore terminals were built to receive, process, blend and distribute the gas.

With the assured availability of natural gas, a government white paper on fuel policy in November 1967 proposed that natural gas should be immediately and more extensively exploited. The Gas Council and area boards began a ten-year programme to convert all users and appliances to operate on natural gas and consequently to discontinue the manufacture of town gas at local gasworks. In a pilot scheme, users on Canvey Island had been converted to natural gas in 1966.

Building the NTS 
To exploit the availability of natural gas and to provide for more widespread distribution, construction began of a major new transmission network which became the National Transmission System.

Feeder pipelines – England 
Gas from the West Sole field was first dispatched from the Easington terminal on the Yorkshire coast in July 1967, via Feeder No. 1 across the Humber to the East Midland Gas Board's gasworks at Killingholme. It was used to enrich low calorific value manufactured gas. Feeder No. 1 was extended to Totley near Sheffield where it connected to the 18-inch methane pipeline. UK natural gas first entered the NTS in July 1968.

Feeder lines from the North Sea gas terminals to the spine of the NTS were laid and brought into use as the shore terminals were constructed. 

The No. 6 feeder runs via Pickering which received gas from a treatment plant for the onshore Lockton gas field.

Feeder pipelines – Scotland 
North Sea gas first reached Scotland in Spring 1970 at Coldstream via an extension of the Leeds-Newcastle pipeline. This pipeline was then extended to Glenmavis near Coatbridge Lanarkshire (Feeder No. 12) where a natural gas liquification plant was constructed.

A major set of pipelines were constructed in Scotland in preparation for arrival of gas from the Frigg gas field in 1977. From the St Fergus terminal in Scotland, two 36-inch (900 mm) pipelines (Feeder No. 10 and No. 11) were laid via Bathgate to Partington and Bishop Auckland to connect to the NTS in England, a total pipeline length of 595 miles (950 km). These lines were commissioned in 1976 and cost £140 million. Initially they carried gas from southern England into Scotland until the Frigg field began production via St Fergus in September 1977. Compressor stations are provided at 40 mile (65 km) intervals along the pipelines. A third 36-inch pipeline from St Fergus (Feeder No. 12) was completed in 1978, and a fourth 40-inch (1050 mm) pipeline (Feeder No. 13) in 1982.

Growth of the NTS 
The NTS was extended from Leeds to Newcastle upon Tyne in early 1969. This line was extended to Coldstream in Spring 1970 and then to Glenmavis, near Coatbridge, Lanarkshire.

The Wales Gas Board received natural gas supplies in 1969 through a 24-inch line from Churchover (Rugby) to Swansea via Wormington (an extension to Feeder No. 2). North Wales was also connected in 1969 via a 24-inch/18-inch pipeline from Audley Cheshire to Maelor near Wrexham (an extension to Feeder No. 4).

The South Western Gas Board received natural gas at the end of 1970 from a 24-inch/20-inch pipeline from Wormington to Exeter (Feeder No. 14).

A 30-inch/24-inch extension of Feeder No. 3 runs to the west of London via Slough to Mogador, Surrey, and was commissioned in 1970. An extension of Feeder No. 5 runs from Horndon-on-the Hill, crosses the Thames at Tilbury and runs via Shorne to connect to Mogador, completing the South London ring main which became operational in early 1972.

In addition to these distribution pipelines, in 1971 the area boards began to supply natural gas directly to major consumers. For example, a 24-inch 17 mile 'spine' pipeline was constructed to ICI Ltd at Billingham (designated as part of Feeder No. 6), and the West Midlands Gas Board laid six similar 'spine' mains into industrial districts of Birmingham and the Black Country.

Most of the NTS was built from the late 1960s to the early 1980s.

Later (post-1983) feeder mains not described above include:

The NTS now comprises over 7,600 km of welded steel gas pipelines. The Canvey to Leeds line is no longer part of the NTS.

LNG storage sites 
In addition to the Canvey Island Liquefied Natural Gas (LNG) import terminal, further LNG storage sites were constructed from the late 1960s. These were peak-shaving facilities used to support the NTS at times of high demand, and to ensure security of gas supplies at strategic locations. When demand was high, liquefied natural gas was pumped from storage tanks, heated in vapourisers to a gaseous state and delivered into the NTS. When demand was low, gas was withdrawn from the NTS and liquefied by cryogenic cooling to minus 162 °C to replenish the storage tanks.

High-pressure gas storage 
In addition to LNG storage for peak-shaving, several sites had storage facilities for high pressure gas that could be released into, and pressurised from, the NTS. The following sites were operational by 1972.
 Isle of Grain, Kent: six 'bullets', 12 ft (3.6 m) diameter, 250 ft (76.2 m) long, capacity 8 million cubic feet (226,000 m3) of gas, operating at up to 1,000 psi (69 bar).
 Beckton gasworks, East London: eight 'bullets', 13.5 ft (4.1 m) diameter, 263 ft (80.1 m) long, capacity 5 million cubic feet (142,000 m3) of gas, pressure cycle 350-100 psi (24-6.9 bar).
 South Western Gas Board, for Bristol and Cheltenham: eleven 'bullets', 13 ft 6 in (4.1 m) diameter, 311 ft 8 in (95 m) long, total capacity 13 million cubic feet (368,000 m3), pressure cycle 450-40 psi (31-2.76 bar).
 Biggin Hill, Kent: seventeen, 42-inch (1.07 m) diameter buried pipes, 1,040 ft (317 m) long, capacity 10 million cubic feet (283,000 m3), operating up to 1,000 psi (69 bar).

Operation

The NTS is the starting point for UK gas distribution. The pipeline system serving houses is not part of the NTS, but is part of the gas distribution network of local distribution zones; the two systems combine to form the UK's gas distribution network.

The two types of gas pipelines in the UK are: large diameter high-pressure (up to 85 bar and 1050 mm diameter) pipelines – the type that the NTS uses – and smaller diameter lower pressure pipelines that connect to users who burn gas for heat. The wall thickness of the high-pressure pipelines is up to 0.625 inches (18mm).

Entry

Gas currently enters the NTS from a number of sources:
 Offshore oil and gas fields on the UK continental shelf. These deliver gas via five (formerly six) UK coastal gas terminals (five in England: CATS Teesside; Easington/Dimlington; Bacton; Rampside Barrow and the former Theddlethorpe terminal; and one in Scotland: St Fergus). Gas from the Liverpool Bay (Douglas) field formerly entered the NTS at Burton Point terminal in Cheshire; this terminal is now identified by National Grid as a NTS offtake to Connah's Quay power station.
 Onshore gas fields such as Saltfleetby, Lincolnshire (production was via the former Theddlethorpe terminal); and Wytch Farm, Dorset.
 Continental Europe. From Norway via the Langeled pipeline and the Easington terminal; from the Netherlands via the BBL pipeline; from Belgium via the Interconnector UK pipeline, both of the latter through Bacton gas terminal.
 Imported LNG. Gas is delivered from import terminals at the Isle of Grain and Milford Haven (South Hook and Dragon). The Canvey Island gas terminal ceased importing LNG in 1984.
 Storage facilities. These include a mixture of salt cavity storage, onshore LNG storage sites, and formerly the depleted onshore gas field at Rough (via Easington terminal). The onshore storage facilities are listed below. The NTS was formerly supplied by the following decommissioned LNG sites: Ambergate, Derbyshire (closed 1985); Dynevor Arms, Merthyr Tydfil (closed 2009); Glenmavis, Lanarkshire (closed 2012); Partington, Greater Manchester (closed 2012); and Avonmouth, Bristol (closed April 2016).

Gas specification and composition 
The specification of gas transported within the NTS is typically within the following parameters.

Parameters marked * are specified in the Gas Safety (Management) Regulations 1996.

The composition of natural gas in the NTS is typically as follows.

Natural gas storage 
Gas storage is used to manage seasonal and short-term variations in the supply and demand of gas in the UK. Facilities include salt caverns and onshore LNG storage sites (see above). From 1985, gas was stored offshore in the depleted Rough gas field, which held nine days' supply and was the UK's largest store; however, its closure was announced in 2017.

The operational onshore gas storage facilities in Britain are as follows.

The salt cavity storage facility at Hornsea, East Yorkshire comprises seven cavities at a depth of 1800 m, which each store up to 60 million m3 of gas at a maximum pressure of 240 bar. The releasable volume of gas is about half of the gross volume. During periods of low demand, gas is compressed into the cavities by electrically driven compressors and fed back onto the NTS at times of peak demand.

Salt cavern storage facilities at Stublach were created by drilling 50 cm diameter holes through 300 metres of rock and 250 metres of salt. This was followed by inserting metal tubes into the holes and filling the annulus with cement to create a leak-tight seal. Water was injected into the wells to dissolve the salt and create brine which was supplied to local industry for the production of bulk chemicals, such as soda ash and chlorine. The caverns created are about 90 metres in diameter and 80 metres tall (each has a volume of 339,300 m3) and are used to hold compressed gas. Stublach is the largest gas storage facility in the UK, containing up to 450 million cubic metres of gas.

Compressor stations 
There are 25 (mostly gas turbine driven) compressor stations and over 25 pressure regulators. Gas moves through the NTS at speeds up to 25 mph (40 km/h), depending on pressures and pipeline diameters. Compressor stations generally operate at a pressure ratio of 1:1.4 – a balance between maintaining pressure and hence flow, and the capital and running cost of the compressors. It also ensures that the temperature rise across the compressors is not high enough to require after-coolers to prevent damage to the pipeline protective coatings. On the pipelines from St Fergus, compressor stations are provided at 40 mile (65 km) intervals; each compresses the gas from about 48 bar at 5 °C to 65 bar at 45 °C.

Compressor stations include:
 England – Wooler, Bishop Auckland, Carnforth, Nether Kellett, Warrington, Hatton, Alrewas, Wisbech, King's Lynn, Peterborough, Churchover, Huntingdon, Cambridge, Diss, Chelmsford, Aylesbury, Lockerley and Wormington.
 Scotland – Aberdeen, Avonbridge, Kirriemuir, Moffat and St Fergus.

Offtakes 
Offtakes from the NTS include those supplying industrial users, local distribution networks, storage sites and export pipelines.  
 To about 71 large users such power stations and industry, either on multi-business sites such as Billingham and Runcorn or to individual companies such as INEOS Teesside. 
 To inland storage sites (see 'Entry') and formerly to the offshore Rough field storage site via the Easington gas terminal. 
 To the Irish interconnectors; the 24-inch 135 km Scotland-Northern Ireland Pipeline (SNIP) to Ballylumford, Northern Ireland, and the two 24-inch UK-Ireland Interconnectors to Dublin, both via an NTS offtake at Moffat, Scotland.
 Gas can be exported to Belgium and the Netherlands via the Interconnector UK and the BBL pipelines, both via the Bacton terminal.
 To the Gas Distribution Network of Local Distribution Zones, as follows:

Gas distribution network

Companies that own part of this gas network, also known as the Local Transmission System (LTS), are known as gas transporters. Gas enters this network via the NTS through a pressure reduction station to the twelve gas distribution zones in Great Britain within eight distribution networks. The LTS is managed from Hinckley, Leicestershire (former headquarters of the NTS). Financial transactions between gas transporters are managed by Xoserve, based in Solihull, which was a department of National Grid before it became an independent company.

For retail distribution, Cadent owns the network in North West England, the West Midlands, the East Midlands, the East of England and North London. In the North of England, local distribution is owned by Northern Gas Networks; in the Wales and West by Wales and West Utilities; and in Southern England and Scotland by SGN.

Ownership
The transmission network is owned by National Gas, which is owned by Macquarie Asset Management, British Columbia Investment Management Corporation, and National Grid plc.

The changing ownership of the NTS reflects developments and corporate changes in the UK's gas and energy industries.
 Gas Council and area boards, 1962 – 31 December 1972
 British Gas Corporation, 1 January 1973 – 24 August 1986
 British Gas plc, 24 August 1986 – 1994
 Transco plc, part of British Gas plc, 1994 – 17 February 1997
 Transco plc, part of BG plc, 17 February 1997 – 1999
 Transco plc, part of BG Group plc, 1999 – 23 October 2000
 Transco plc, part of Lattice Group plc, 23 October 2000 – 21 October 2002
 National Grid Transco plc from 21 October 2002; renamed National Grid Gas plc on 10 October 2005
 Macquarie, BCI and National Grid from January 2023

Northern Ireland
Northern Ireland is not part of the NTS and gets its gas via the Scotland-Northern Ireland pipeline (SNIP), owned by Premier Transmission and built between 1994 and 1996. The gas network in Northern Ireland is split, with one area owned by Phoenix Natural Gas and the other by Firmus Energy.

See also
 Humber Gas Tunnel
 Central Area Transmission System
 United Kingdom–Ireland natural gas interconnectors

References

External links 
 Gas Transmission System Operations
 Map of the NTS at National Grid
 Detailed map of the NTS
 Instantaneous gas flows into the NTS
 Pipeline projects at National Grid plc
 Ownership of the gas distribution network, archived in 2008
 Society of British Gas Industries, archived in 2012
 Xoserve
 GCSE PDF factsheet about the NTS, archived from www.energynetworks.org in 2011
 Origins and Growth of the British Gas Plant Operations Department (including pipeline maps) www.oldflames.org.uk
 Statement of Gas Transmission Transportation Charges Table 3 & 5

Natural gas pipelines in the United Kingdom